Peyrusse can refer to:

 Peyrusse, commune in Cantal department, France
 Peyrusse-Grande, commune in Gers department, France
 Peyrusse-le-Roc, commune in Aveyron department, France
 Peyrusse-Massas, commune in Gers department, France
 Peyrusse-Vieille, commune in Gers department, France